The Cantaura massacre was an incident on 4 October 1982 in which a guerrillas' camp near Cantaura in Venezuela's state of Anzoátegui was destroyed, and 23 of the 41 guerrilla fighters of the Frente Américo Silva killed.

See also
List of massacres in Venezuela

References

Massacres in 1982
1982 in Venezuela 
1982 murders in Venezuela 
October 1982 events
Massacres in Venezuela